Klimov Bluff is a partly ice-free east-facing bluff, located at the southeast end of the Jenkins Heights,  southeast of Mount Bray, Walgreen Coast, Marie Byrd Land, Antarctica. It was mapped by the United States Geological Survey from surveys and U.S. Navy air photos, 1959–66, and was named by the Advisory Committee on Antarctic Names after , a Soviet exchange scientist who wintered at McMurdo Station in 1966. He accompanied the United States Antarctic Research Program Marie Byrd Land Survey party, 1966–67.

References

Cliffs of Marie Byrd Land